Jelping-Ja-Oyka was an antagonist of the hero Mir-Susne-Hum in the Ugrian mythology. His name means Spirit of Bear or perhaps Bear Spirit.

References

World view of the Hanti

Ugrian mythology
Mythological bears